Chrysozephyrus smaragdinus is a small butterfly found in the East Palearctic that belongs to the lycaenids or blues family.

Subspecies
C. s. smaragdinus Ussuri, China (Shaanxi, Sichuan)
C. s. abaensis  Dantchenko , 2000 China
C. s. doerriesi  Dantchenko , 2000  Sakhalin
C. s. odakae   (Watari, 1929)  Japan (Honshu)
C. s. amoenus  (Murayama, 1954)  Japan (Honshu)
C. s. esakii  (Umeno, 1937)  Japan
C. s. luxurians (Murayama, 1953) Japan (Honshu)
C. s. sikongensis (Murayama, 1955) China
C. s. yunnanensis  (Howarth, 1957)  West China (N.Yunnan)

Description from Seitz

Z. Smaragdina Brem. As said above, hardly different from Chrysozephyrus brillantina|brillantina on the upperside, at least no 
reliable differences have ever been mentioned. Therefore a figure of the upper surface would have been the same as that of brillantina, whose golden gloss does not nearly come up to that of the actual specimens. But the pale, more dust-grey, underside distinguishes it from the preceding species, as also does a transverse line on the hindwing which is placed far proximally from the usual band. However, the main difference lies in the larva , which is yellow instead of brown , with distinctly contrasting black stigma-dots on segments 1 and 4 to 11; on cherry, according to Graeser also on Quercus mongolica, very plentiful in certain years, but a large proportion (90%) infested by Tachina. The butterflies are consequently much rarer than the caterpillars; they fly in July and August and settle on twigs of shrubs at road-sides. — With certainty only known from Amurland and North China; the records from other countries are doubtful, as the insect may possibly have been confounded with other green species.

Biology
The larva feeds on Cerasus glandulosa,  Cerasus spp., Prunus spp.( P. sargentii. P. matsumurana, P. verecunda, P. padus, P. jamasakura, P. buergeriana, P. donarium, P. yedoensis, P. subhirtella), Quercus mongolica , Carpinus laxiflora, Celtis sinensis

See also
List of butterflies of Russia

References

Theclinae
Butterflies described in 1861
Butterflies of Asia
Taxa named by Otto Vasilievich Bremer